Viktor Alekseyevich Mushtakov (born 19 December 1996) is a Russian speed skater who specializes in the sprint distances.

Career
In 2016 he won the gold medal in the team sprint at the World Junior Championships in Changchun, China.

At the second competition weekend of the 2018–19 ISU Speed Skating World Cup he finished second in the second 500m event behind Tatsuya Shinhama.

He is coached by Dmitry Dorofeyev.

World Cup podiums

Personal records

References

External links

Viktor Mushtakov bio page 	
Viktor Mushtakov sports bio
ISU profile
Eurosport profile

1996 births
Russian male speed skaters
Living people
Sportspeople from Barnaul
World Single Distances Speed Skating Championships medalists
Speed skaters at the 2022 Winter Olympics
Olympic speed skaters of Russia